Akram Ahmed Abdullah Al-Noor (born 3 December 1987) is a retired Yemeni taekwondo practitioner. Al-Noor qualified for the Yemeni squad, as a 16-year-old teen, in the men's flyweight category (58 kg) at the 2004 Summer Olympics in Athens by receiving a berth from the World Olympic Qualifying Tournament in Paris, France. He lost the preliminary round of sixteen match to Ukraine's Oleksandr Shaposhnyk with a default score of 5–7. Al-Noor was also appointed as the Yemeni flag bearer by the National Olympic Committee in the opening ceremony.

References

External links
 
 

1987 births
Living people
Yemeni male taekwondo practitioners
Olympic taekwondo practitioners of Yemen
Taekwondo practitioners at the 2004 Summer Olympics
People from Sanaa
Asian Games medalists in taekwondo
Taekwondo practitioners at the 2002 Asian Games
Asian Games bronze medalists for Yemen
Medalists at the 2002 Asian Games